Gondow Bazar (also Romanized as Gondow Bāzār and Gandū Bāzār; also known as Gandū and Gondow) is a village in Polan Rural District, Polan District, Chabahar County, Sistan and Baluchestan Province, Iran. At the 2006 census, its population was 217, in 30 families.

References 

Populated places in Chabahar County